8 is the debut studio album by Shea Couleé, released on February 24, 2023.

Composition 
"Your Name" has been described as "a groovy Disco banger".

Promotion
"Let Go" and "Your Name" were released as singles and received a 1980s-inspired music video.

Track listing
 "Collide"
 "Divine"
 "New Phone Who Dis?"
 "La Perla"
 "Let Go"
 "Your Name"
 "Material"
 "Self Control"

References

2023 albums
Albums by American artists